Rubuubi Kyebambe IIl was Omukama of the Kingdom of Toro, in 1875 and from 1877 until 1879. He was the seventh (7th) Omukama of Toro.

Claim to the throne
He was the fourth son of Kasunga Kyebambe Nyaika, Omukama of Toro, from 1866 until 1871 and from 1871 until 1872. No mention is made of his mother. He ascended to the throne following the abdication of his elder brother, Rukirabasaija Isingoma Rukidi II in 1875.

Personal life
No mention is made about the marital life of Omukama Rububi Kyebambe II. It is not known how many children were fathered by Omukama Rububi Kyebambe II.

His reign
He became Omukama following the abdication of his brother, Rukidi II, in 1875. However, later that year, Toro was invaded by the  Bunyoro Army under the command of Chief Kikukule  of Bugangaizi. He fled to Buganda. Two years later, he returned and deposed his younger brother, Omukama Katera, in 1877. He ruled until he himself was deposed in 1879.

The final years
Omukama Rububi Kyebambe II deposed by his younger brother, Rukirabasaija Kakende Nyamuyonjo, in 1879, with the support of the Buganda Army. It is not known where and how Omukama Rububi Kyebambe died or what caused his death.

Succession table:First time

Succession table:Second time

See also
 Omukama of Toro

References

Toro
19th-century rulers in Africa